A military man may be:
A member of the military
Miles Gloriosus (Latin: boastful soldier), a stock character
Il Capitano, also known as "Captain Fracasse" or "The Spanish Captain", a commedia dell'arte figure
Colonel Blimp, a British variation on the miles gloriosus character
The Military Man (French: Le Militaire), a 2014 Canadian film
"Military Man", a song by Gary Moore, from Run for Cover